"The Carny" is a song by Nick Cave and the Bad Seeds appearing on their fourth studio album Your Funeral... My Trial. It was written by Nick Cave and was recorded in August 1986 at Hansa Tonstudio and Strongroom.

Subject
The lyrics concern a carnival worker who vanished, highlighted in the words "No one saw the Carny go". As the circus prepares to leave without the missing performer, they find the Carny's horse Sorrow, "so skin and bone", and kill it. The dwarfs Moses and Noah dig a ditch to bury it, later remarking "we should've dug a deeper one". When it begins to rain, the Carny's caravan is swept away.

The song is featured in Wim Wenders' 1987 film Wings of Desire, when the character Marion (Solveig Dommartin) listens to the album Your Funeral, My Trial. The song corresponds to the plot, in which the circus that Marion works for as a trapeze artist closes down. Professor Adrian Danks wrote "The Carny" adds a feel of sorrow in the background, while Marion gives "breathy accompaniment". Cave personally appears in the film in later scenes.

Accolades

Personnel
Adapted from the Your Funeral... My Trial liner notes.

Nick Cave and The Bad Seeds
 Blixa Bargeld – guitar, co-lead vocals
 Nick Cave – lead vocals, harmonica
 Mick Harvey – organ, piano, glockenspiel, xylophone
 Thomas Wydler – drums

Production and additional personnel
 Tony Cohen – production, engineering
 Flood – production, engineering, mixing

See also
Nick Cave and The Bad Seeds discography

References 

1986 songs
Nick Cave songs
Songs written by Nick Cave
Song recordings produced by Flood (producer)